Events from the year 1719 in Sweden

Incumbents
 Monarch – Ulrika Eleonora

Events 
 * January - The Carolean Death March.
 23 January - The Riksdag of the Estates refuse the recognize Queen Ulrika Eleonora as monarch by inheritance, but agree to recognize her as monarch by election after she agrees to ratify a new constitution, Instrument of Government (1719), introducing a parliamentary system and a constitutional monarchy. 
 27 January - The remains of Charles XII arrive to Karlberg Palace outside the capital. 
 19 February - Queen Ulrika Eleonora signs the new constitution. 
 19 February - The execution of Georg Heinrich von Görtz.  
 21 February - The new constitution is applied and the absolute monarchy is thereby abolished. 
 26 February - The burial of Charles XII. 
 17 March - The coronation of Queen Ulrika Eleonora. 
 10 April - Arvid Horn steps down as Privy Council Chancellery. 
 15 May - Gustav Cronhielm appointed Privy Council Chancellery. 
 July to August - The Russian Pillage of 1719-1721. 
 24 July - Nyköping is burned during the Russian Pillage of 1719-1721.
 13 August - The Russian unsuccessfully attacks Stockholm in the Battle of Stäket during the Russian Pillage of 1719-1721. 
 19 August - Norrtälje is burned during the Russian Pillage of 1719-1721
 9 November – Peace between Sweden and Hannover. 
 9 December - Arvid Horn replace Gustav Cronhielm as Privy Council Chancellery.
 - Formation of the Caps (party) and Hats (party).
 - The Södermalm riots, one of the biggest riots in Stockholm history, originating from a fight in a brothel, spread in the poorer areas of Stockholm where it lasts for several days, resulting in a great deal of damage.
 - Boërosia by Nils Hufwedsson Dal

Births
 
 5 April - Axel von Fersen the Elder, politician (died 1794) 
 - Petter Stenborg, actor and theater director  (died 1781) 
 - Charlotta Sparre, courtier  (died 1795) 
 - Christina Nyman, brewer (died 1795)

Deaths

 February 19 - Georg Heinrich von Görtz, diplomat and royal favorite  (born 1688) 
 - Catharina Wallenstedt, letter writer  (born 1627)

References

 
Years of the 18th century in Sweden
Sweden